Tooba Siddiqui, is a Pakistani actress and model. Siddiqui started her career by starring in a Music Video "My Love" for pop singer Yasir Akhtar. She began modeling for the Pakistani fashion industry in the early 2000s. She has appeared in campaigns for Deevees and Diva. After a break from acting, Tooba returned to the screen for Hit Thriller Series Dushman-e-Jaan.

Pakistani television

Siddiqui has starred in several Pakistani television serials, short plays and telefilms.
{|class="wikitable"
!Year
!Title
!Role
!Notes
|-
|2009–11
| Bol Meri Machli
|Noreen
|
|-
|2010
| Dil Hai Chota Sa
|Kehkeshan "Kuku"
|
|-
| 2010
| Noor Bano
| Alvina
|
|-
| 2011
| Kitni Girhain Baaki Hain
| –
|
|-
| 2011
| Mujhe Hai Hukm-e-Azaan
| Simran
|
|-
| 2012
| Pal May Ishq Pal May Nahi
| Pari
|
|-
| 2017
| Iltija
| Hina
|
|-
| 2018
| Tum Se Hi Talluq Hai
| Alina
| 
|-
| 2020 
| Dushman e Jaan
| Ramsha Farooqui
|
|-
| 2021
| Khuda Aur Muhabbat (season 3)
| Romana|
|}

 Filmography 
  Ajnabe Shehr Mein Wrong No. (2015) 'special appearance in song Nachey Mann'
 Dobara Phir Se'' (2016)

Accolades

See also 
 List of Pakistani actresses

References

External links
 
 

Living people
Pakistani female models
Pakistani television actresses
Actresses from Karachi
21st-century Pakistani actresses
Year of birth missing (living people)